Uma Devi Khatik is an Indian politician and member of Legislative Assembly of Madhya Pradesh. She represents the Hatta (Damoh) constituency of Madhya Pradesh and is a member of the Bharatiya Janata Party political party.

Early life and education 
She completed 12th class in 2006.

Political career 
Uma Devi Khatik is a member of the Legislative Assembly. She represents the Hatta constituency of Madhya Pradesh and is a member of the Bharatiya Janata Party political party.

References 

1957 births
Living people
Madhya Pradesh MLAs 2008–2013
Madhya Pradesh MLAs 2013–2018
Madhya Pradesh MLAs 2018–2023
Bharatiya Janata Party politicians from Chhattisgarh
People from Damoh
Bharatiya Janata Party politicians from Madhya Pradesh